Divarctia is a monotypic genus of tiger moths in the family Erebidae. The genus contains one species, Divarctia diva, from Central Asia.

References
Natural History Museum Lepidoptera generic names catalog

Arctiina
Monotypic moth genera
Moths described in 1887
Moths of Asia